Junior Yvan Nyabeye Dibango (born 10 March 2002) is a Cameroonian professional footballer who plays for Kryvbas Kryvyi Rih on loan from Levadia Tallinn.

International career
Dibango represented Cameroon at 2021 Africa U-20 Cup of Nations.

References

External links 
 
 

2002 births
Living people
Cameroonian footballers
Association football forwards
FC Isloch Minsk Raion players
FCI Levadia Tallinn players
FC Kryvbas Kryvyi Rih players
Ukrainian Premier League players
Cameroonian expatriate footballers
Expatriate footballers in Belarus
Cameroonian expatriate sportspeople in Belarus
Expatriate footballers in Estonia
Cameroonian expatriate sportspeople in Estonia
Expatriate footballers in Ukraine
Cameroonian expatriate sportspeople in Ukraine